The White Carnation is a 1953 play by English playwright R. C. Sherriff. Its premiere production had a cast led by Ralph Richardson, but it was not revived until a 2013 Finborough Theatre production featuring Aden Gillett and Benjamin Whitrow.

In 2014, the play was performed at the Jermyn Street Theatre

Plot
John Greenwood says goodbye to the guests from he and his wife's Christmas Eve, but a gust of wind shuts the front door and leaves him locked out of his own house. He breaks a window to gain entry and finds the house ruined and deserted. A policeman questions him what he is doing in the house, all of whose inhabitants were killed by a V-1 flying bomb during a Christmas Eve party in 1944, but Greenwood indignantly insists that he is in his own house. A coroner and doctor are summoned and inform Greenwood that he was one of the inhabitants killed and that he has returned to the house as a ghost - and that is now 1951.

Greenwood is visited by Lydia Truscott, niece of the town clerk, who agrees to help him in his attempts at self-education and returning to the spirit-world. He also meets with a welcome from the local vicar Mr. Pendlebury and his next door neighbour Mrs. Carter, but also has to deal with the coroner and the Home Office, who are determined to move Greenwood out, knock the house down and build new flats on the site.

As the house's demolition begins, Greenwood finally vanishes and in a final scene re-runs his last Christmas Eve party, reconciling with his wife, whom during his haunting he had realised that he had emotionally ill-treated during his lifetime.

Critical reaction 
Writing in The Sunday Times, the critic Harold Hobson called the original production of the play "extremely and touchingly human". Of the revival Dominic Cavendish writing in the Telegraph observed, "what a neglected little treasure it proves: not life-changing, maybe, but life-affirming". However, writing in The Guardian, Michael Billington called the play "passably entertaining, but much of its feels like quilted padding."

1963 Australian TV version

The play was adapted for Australian TV in 1963 directed by Christopher Muir. Australian TV drama was relatively rare at the time.

Plot
A group of ghosts gather to re-enact the time they were killed by a bomb.

Cast
Michael Duffield as John Greenwood the ghost
Stewart Weller		
Neville Thurgood		
Roly Barlee		
Barbara Brandon		
Margaret Cruikshank		
Brian Gilmar		
Edward Hepple		
Jane Oehr as Lydia		
Alwyn Owen		
Hugh Stewart		
Leslie Wright		
Felicity Young

Production
The set was designed by Kevin Bartlett.

Chris Muir says while filming it the set caught fire. They kept filming it while the studio hands put out the fire with extinguishers before the sprinklers went on.

See also
List of television plays broadcast on Australian Broadcasting Corporation (1960s)

References

1953 plays
Plays by R. C. Sherriff
Comedy plays
Ghosts in written fiction
Plays set in London
Plays set in the 1950s
1963 television plays
West End plays